The Suofengying Dam is a concrete gravity dam on the Wu River,  northwest of Guiyang in Guizhou Province, China. The primary purpose of the dam is hydroelectric power generation and it supports a 600 MW power station. Construction on the dam began on 26 July 2002 and on December 18 of that year, the river was diverted. Pouring of roller-compacted concrete into the dam's body began on 14 January 2004 and in June, the dam began to impound its reservoir. On 18 August, the first generator was operational and the last two in 2005. The dam's power station is located on its right bank and contains three 200 MW Francis turbine-generators.

See also

List of dams and reservoirs in China
List of major power stations in Guizhou

References

Dams in China
Hydroelectric power stations in Guizhou
Gravity dams
Dams completed in 2006
Dams on the Wu River
Energy infrastructure completed in 2006
Roller-compacted concrete dams